Chad Alexander Mirkin (born November 23, 1963) is an American chemist. He is the George B. Rathmann professor of chemistry, professor of medicine, professor of materials science and engineering, professor of biomedical engineering, and professor of chemical and biological engineering, and director of the International Institute for Nanotechnology and Center for Nanofabrication and Molecular Self-Assembly at Northwestern University.

Mirkin is known for his development of nanoparticle-based biodetection schemes, the invention of dip-pen nanolithography (recognized by National Geographic as one of the top 100 scientific discoveries that changed the world), and contributions to supramolecular chemistry, nanoelectronics, and nanooptics. In 2010, he was listed as the most cited chemist in the world over the last decade in terms of total citations, the second highest most cited chemist in terms of impact factor, and the top most cited nanomedicine researcher.

Early life and education 
Mirkin was born November 23, 1963, in Phoenix, Arizona. He received his B.S. degree from Dickinson College in 1986 and his PhD from Penn State University in 1989. He was an NSF postdoctoral research fellow at Massachusetts Institute of Technology where he worked with Professor Mark S. Wrighton on microelectrode devices for electrocatalysis. He became a professor at Northwestern University in 1991.

Research 
The focus of Mirkin's research is on developing methods for controlling the architecture of molecules and materials on the 1 – 100 nm length scale and utilizing such structures in the development of analytical tools that can be used in the areas of chemical and biological sensing, lithography, catalysis, and optics. Mirkin has pioneered the use of DNA and nanoparticles as synthons in materials science and the development of nanoparticle-based biodiagnostics.

A common strategy used by Mirkin's group is the use of the unique properties of spherical nucleic acids (SNAs), spherical arrangements of nucleic acids with or without organic or inorganic nanoparticle cores, to enable the synthesis of novel materials and colloidal crystals, the development of high sensitivity probes for chemical and medical diagnostic purposes, and single-entity structures capable of intracellular gene regulation.  His 1996 work with SNA-gold nanoparticle conjugates introduced the concept of a nanoparticle as an atom and nucleic acids as bonds, and it laid the ground work for the fields of colloidal crystal engineering with DNA and molecular diagnostics based upon well-defined nanoparticle and nanocrystal bioconjugates.  SNAs are the cornerstone of Luminex's FDA-cleared Verigene system (now used in over half of the world's top hospitals), EMD Millipore's SmartFlare platform (now distributed by AuraSense, after Millipore was acquired by Sigma-Aldrich), and four drugs in human clinical trials. In addition, his inventions of DPN, Polymer Pen Lithography (PPL), and Beam Pen Lithography (BPL) are the basis for the TERA-fab M and E series commercial patterning tools, known as desktop fabs (TERA-print, LLC).

He has published over 850 manuscripts, with a Google Scholar H-index of 192, and has over 1200 patents and patent applications.

Mirkin has been elected into all three branches of the National Academies of Sciences, Engineering, and Medicine, the 10th person so honored. He has served on several editorial advisory boards, including ACS Nano, the Journal of the American Chemical Society and Angewandte Chemie. He is the founding editor of the nanotechnology journal Small, and he is an associate editor of the Journal of the American Chemical Society.  Mirkin is a co-founder of multiple companies, including NanoInk, Nanosphere (acquired by Luminex for $83M in 2016 ), Azul 3D, TERA-print, Exicure, and Stoicheia.

Information scientists at CAS, a division of the American Chemical Society, singled out Mirkin and his contributions to supramolecular chemistry and nanomaterials in an article about potential future winners of the Nobel Prize in Chemistry, saying that “Overall, Mirkin’s work set up the foundation of modern nanotechnology and development of related diagnostic, therapeutic, and material applications.”

Science policy 
In addition to his academic and research work, Mirkin has been involved in shaping science policy decisions.
From 2009 to 2017 Mirkin was appointed to President Barack Obama's President's Council of Advisors on Science and Technology (PCAST). He co-chaired the PCAST report titled, "Engage to Excel," focusing on teaching and engagement issues involving students who are in their first two years of undergraduate study at R-1, 2 and 4-year institutions, and community colleges.

Awards and honors 
 2023 – King Faisal Prize
 2002 - MRS Medal
 2022 – John P. McGovern Science and Society Award 
 2022 – Faraday Medal
 2022 – UNESCO-Equatorial Guinea International Prize for Research in the Life Sciences
 2021 – De Gennes Prize (Royal Society of Chemistry) 
 2021 – Acta Biomaterialia Gold Medal 
 2021 – G.M. Kosolapoff Award 
 2020 – AAAS Philip Hauge Abelson Prize
 2019 – Kabiller Prize in Nanoscience and Nanomedicine
 2019 – Perkin Medal
 2019 – Netherlands Award for Supramolecular Chemistry 
 2018 – Theodore William Richards Medal 
 2018 – Ira Remsen Award
 2018 – Chinese Friendship Award
 2018 – Harrison Howe Award
 2018 – Nano Research Award 
 2017 – William H. Nichols Medal Award
 2016 – Dickson Prize
 2016 – Rusnano Prize
 2016 – Dan David Prize
 2016 – American Institute of Chemists Gold Medal
 2015 – American Institute for Medical and Biological Engineering Fellow 
 2015 – Raymond and Beverly Sackler Prize in Convergence Research of the National Academy of Sciences
 2015 – Royal Society of Chemistry Centenary Prize
 2014 – Vittorio de Nora Award, Electrochemical Society 
 2014 – Honorary Professor, Nanjing Tech University 
 2013 – Chemistry World Entrepreneur of the Year 
 2013 – Linus Pauling Award
 2012 – Lee Kuan Yew Distinguished Visitor to Singapore 
 2012 – Honorary Doctorate of Engineering, Nanyang Technological University, Singapore 
 2012 – American Chemical Society Award for Creative Invention 
 2011 – Member of the American Academy of Arts and Sciences 
 2010 – Member of the Institute of Medicine
 2010 – Member of the National Academy of Sciences
 2009 – Member of the National Academy of Engineering
 2009 – Lemelson-MIT Prize
 2007 – Alumni Fellow, Pennsylvania State University 
 2004 – NIH Director's Pioneer Award
 2004 – Outstanding Science Alumni Award, Pennsylvania State University 
 2004 – Honorary Degree, Dickinson College, Carlisle, PA 
 2004 – American Chemical Society Nobel Laureate Signature Award 
 2003 – Raymond and Beverly Sackler Prize
 2002 – Feynman Prize
 2001 – Leo Hendrik Baekeland Award 
 2000 – Appointed to chair endowed by George B. Rathmann
 1999 – ACS Award in Pure Chemistry
 1992 – Beckman Young Investigators Award

References

External links 
 Northwestern University Chemistry Department
 The Mirkin Research Group
 International Institute for Nanotechnology at Northwestern University

1963 births
Living people
21st-century American chemists
Jewish chemists
Northwestern University faculty
Dickinson College alumni
Pennsylvania State University alumni
Members of the United States National Academy of Engineering
Members of the United States National Academy of Sciences
Fellows of the American Institute for Medical and Biological Engineering
Members of the National Academy of Medicine
American scientists